A torch song is a sentimental love song, typically one in which the singer laments an unrequited or lost love, either where one party is oblivious to the existence of the other, where one party has moved on, or where a romantic affair has affected the relationship. The term comes from the saying, "to carry a torch for someone", or to keep aflame the light of an unrequited love. It was first used by the cabaret singer Tommy Lyman in his praise of "My Melancholy Baby".  

The term is also explicitly cited in the song "Jim", popularized by versions by Dinah Shore, Billie Holiday, Sarah Vaughan and Ella Fitzgerald: 

Torch-singing is more of a niche than a genre and can stray from the traditional jazz-influenced style of singing; the American tradition of the torch song typically relies upon the melodic structure of the blues. An example of a collection is Billie Holiday's 1955 album Music for Torching.

See also 
 Sentimental ballads

References

External links
Torch Songs at AllMusic

 
 
Song forms